The North York Rangers are a Junior "A" ice hockey team located in the North York district of Toronto, Ontario, Canada. They are a part of the South Division of the Ontario Junior Hockey League (OJHL) and were previously a part of the Metro Junior A Hockey League.

History
The Metro Junior "B" level Woodbridge Rangers moved to North York in 1967, renaming the team the North York Rangers. They advanced to the "A" league until 1972, winning several league titles before folding in 1985. When the Richmond Hill Rams Metro Junior "A" team moved to North York in 1992, they brought back the North York Rangers name. Seven seasons later, the league folded, and the North York Rangers were brought into the OJHL, where they continue to play as of 2017.

Season-by-season results

Playoffs
Original OPJHL Years1973 Lost Semi-finalRichmond Hill Rams defeated Ajax Steelers 4-games-to-2Toronto Nationals defeated Richmond Hill Rams 4-games-to-21974 Lost Quarter-finalWexford Raiders defeated Richmond Hill Rams 4-games-to-21975 Lost Quarter-finalToronto Nationals defeated Richmond Hill Rams 4-games-to-21976 Lost Quarter-finalMarkham Waxers defeated Richmond Hill Rams 3-games-to-2 with 2 ties1977 Lost Quarter-finalNorth York Rangers defeated Richmond Hill Rams 4-games-to-11978 DNQ1979 DNQ1980 DNQ1981 DNQ1982 Lost Semi-finalRichmond Hill Rams defeated Newmarket Flyers 4-games-to-3Guelph Platers defeated Richmond Hill Rams 4-games-to-none1983 Lost Quarter-finalNewmarket Flyers defeated Richmond Hill Rams 4-games-to-31984 Lost Quarter-finalNorth York Rangers defeated Richmond Hill Dynes 4-games-to-21985 Lost Quarter-finalNewmarket Flyers defeated Richmond Hill Dynes 4-games-to-21986 DNQ1987 Lost Semi-finalAurora Eagles defeated Richmond Hill Dynes 4-games-to-2MetJHL Years1990 DNQ1991 Lost Quarter-finalRichmond Hill Rams defeated Mimico Monarchs 2-games-to-1Bramalea Blues defeated Richmond Hill Rams 4-games-to-11992 Lost Quarter-finalBramalea Blues defeated Richmond Hill Rams 4-games-to-11993 Lost Quarter-finalWellington Dukes defeated North York Rangers 4-games-to-none''

NHL alumni
Richmond Hill Dynes to play in the National Hockey League:
 Doug Dadswell, Randy Exelby, Ron Hoover, Curtis Joseph, Darrin Madeley, Darryl Shannon

Richmond Hill Rams to play in the National Hockey League:
 Mike Donnelly, Pat Hughes, Darren Lowe, Dave Lumley, Frank Nigro, Alex Pirus

North York Rangers alumni to play in the National Hockey League:
 Scott Barney, Greg Koehler, David Nemirovsky, Theo Peckham, Peter Sarno, Stephen Weiss

References

External links
Rangers Webpage

Ontario Provincial Junior A Hockey League teams
Ice hockey teams in Toronto
1969 establishments in Ontario
Ice hockey clubs established in 1969